

The Fieseler Fi 333 was a prototype transport aircraft developed by Fieseler in 1942, and backed by the Luftwaffe.

Design and development 
The aircraft was to use detachable pods of varying sizes to carry cargo, a system that would allow a rapid turnaround on the ground. The tall, fixed undercarriage featured tandem independently sprung wheels.  Power was provided by two  BMW Bramo 323D radial engines.

Three prototypes are believed to have been built.

Specifications

See also

References 

Fi 333
Abandoned military aircraft projects of Germany
World War II transport aircraft of Germany
Modular aircraft
Low-wing aircraft
Twin piston-engined tractor aircraft